Pioneer League may refer to:

Pioneer Football League, American non-scholarship NCAA Division I Football Championship Subdivision conference
Pioneer League (baseball), minor league baseball league
Pioneer League (California), a high-school athletic conference in South Bay, Los Angeles, California, U.S.